The livre was the currency of Guadeloupe until 1816. It was subdivided into 20 sous, each of 12 deniers, with the escalin worth 15 sous. The Guadeloupe livre  was a French colonial currency, distinguished by the use, in part, of Spanish coins.

History
Initially, the French livre circulated. This was supplemented by overstamped and cut coins in the late 18th and early 19th centuries, especially between 1811 and 1816 when Guadeloupe was occupied by Britain. The French franc replaced the livre after French control was re-established, with the Guadeloupe franc issued from 1848.

Coins
In 1793, French 12 deniers coins were overstamped with the letters "RF" and circulated for 3 sous 9 deniers ( escalin). In 1802, 1 and 4 escalins coins were produced by cutting Spanish dollars into a central, octagonal part for the 4 escalins coins and eight outer sections for the 1 escalin coins. Both were stamped with "RF" and the 4 escalins were also stamped "4E".

In 1811, a number of different denominations were issued, all of which were stamped with a crowned letter "G". 10 sous coins were produced from Spanish and Spanish colonial  real, British 3 pence and French  écu. 20 sous coins were produced from 1 real, 12 sous and 6 pence coins, and central plugs cut from Spanish dollars. 40 sous coins were produced from  écu, 24 sous and 1 shilling coins. 9 livres coins were produced from Spanish dollars from which a central plug (used to make 20 sous coins) had been cut. Brazilian 6,400 réis were overstamped with the crowned "G" and "82.10" to produced 82 livres 10 sous coins. In 1813, 2 livres 5 sous coins were produced from quarter segments of Spanish dollars.

See also

Holey dollar
Economy of Guadeloupe

References

Modern obsolete currencies
Livre
1816 disestablishments
Currencies of the Caribbean